Iileh (also Romanized as Iīleh) is a village in Karat Rural District, in the Central District of Taybad County, Razavi Khorasan Province, Iran. At the 2006 census, its population was 167, in 37 families.

References 

Populated places in Taybad County